The woolly lemurs, also known as avahis or woolly indris, are nine species of strepsirrhine primates in the genus Avahi. Like all other lemurs, they live only on the island of Madagascar.

Their fur is short and woolly. The body can be grey brown to reddish, with white on the back of the thighs, with a long, orange tail. The head is round with a short muzzle and ears hidden in the fur.

Woolly lemurs can be found in both humid and dry forests, spending most of their time in the leafy copse. Like many leafeaters, they need long naps to digest their food. Woolly lemurs live together in groups of two to five animals, which often consist of parents and several generations of their offspring.

Like all indriids, the woolly lemurs are strictly herbivorous, eating predominantly leaves, but also buds and, rarely, flowers.

Males and females live in pairs. Although likely, the presence of extrapair copulations (which exist in other pair-living nocturnal lemurs, e.g. the Masoala fork-marked lemur (Phaner furcifer) and the fat-tailed dwarf lemur (Cheirogaleus medius)) has never been demonstrated in Avahi species. The gestation period is four to five months, with births usually coming in September. In the first few months, the young rides on the back of its mother. After about six months, it is weaned, and can live independently after a year, although it will typically live for another year in proximity to its mother. Overall life expectancy is not known.

On November 11, 2005, a research team that discovered a new species of woolly lemur in 1990 in western Madagascar named the species, Bemaraha woolly lemur (Avahi cleesei), after actor John Cleese, in recognition of Cleese's work to save lemurs in the wild. In 2006, a taxonomic revision of eastern avahis based on genetic and morphological analyses led to the identification of two additional species: A. meridionalis and A. peyrierasi. Further taxonomic revision increased the number of species, by adding A. ramanantsoavana and A. betsileo. Finally a new species was discovered in the Masoala peninsula, Moore's woolly lemur (A. mooreorum).

Classification
Nine species are currently recognized:

 Eastern woolly lemur, Avahi laniger
 Western woolly lemur, Avahi occidentalis
 Sambirano woolly lemur, Avahi unicolor
 Bemaraha woolly lemur, Avahi cleesei
 Peyrieras's woolly lemur, Avahi peyrierasi
 Southern woolly lemur, Avahi meridionalis
 Ramanantsoavana's woolly lemur, Avahi ramanantsoavani
 Betsileo woolly lemur, Avahi betsileo
 Moore's woolly lemur, Avahi mooreorum

References

External links

Image of female and young
Primate Info Net Avahi Factsheets

Woolly lemurs